The Team competition at the FIS Ski Flying World Championships 2022 was held on 13 March 2022.

Results
The first round was started at 16:30 and the final round at 17:30.

References

Team